AD 23 (XXIII) was a common year starting on Friday (link will display the full calendar) of the Julian calendar. At the time, it was known as the Year of the Consulship of Pollio and Vetus (or, less frequently, year 776 Ab urbe condita). The denomination AD 23 for this year has been used since the early medieval period, when the Anno Domini calendar era became the prevalent method in Europe for naming years.

Events

By place

Roman Empire 
 Greek geographer Strabo publishes Geography, a work covering the world known to the Romans and Greeks at the time of Emperor Augustus – it is the only such book to survive from the ancient world.
 Emperor Tiberius' son Drusus Julius Caesar dies.  From that point forward, he seems to lose interest in the Empire and occupies himself with the pursuit of pleasure.
 Lucius Aelius Sejanus begins to dominate the Roman Senate and Tiberius, after the death of Drusus.

China 
 Liu Xuan, a descendant of the Han Dynasty royal family and leader of insurgents against the Xin Dynasty, proclaims himself emperor against Wang Mang.
 July – After being under siege for two months, about 19,000 insurgents under Liu Xiu defeat 450,000 of Wang Mang's troops in the Battle of Kunyang, ushering in the fall of Wang Mang's Xin Dynasty and restoration of the Han Dynasty.
 October 6 — Emperor Liu Xuan's forces kill Wang Mang at the end of a three-day siege.

Births 
 Pliny the Elder, Roman scientist and writer (d. 79 AD)

Deaths 
 September 14 – Drusus Julius Caesar, son of Emperor Tiberius (b. 14 BC)
 October 6 – Wang Mang, Chinese emperor of the Xin Dynasty (b. c. 45 BC)
 Juba II, king of Mauretania (b. c. 50 BC)
 Liu Xin, Chinese astronomer, mathematician and politician (b. c. 50 BC)
 Liu Yan, Chinese general and politician
 Servius Cornelius Lentulus Maluginensis, Roman statesman
 Wang, Chinese empress of the Xin Dynasty (b. 8 BC)

References 

0023

als:20er#23